Didí Torrico Camacho (born 18 May 1988 in Cochabamba) is a Bolivian football midfielder who currently plays for Wilstermann  and the Bolivia national team.

Career
Torrico began his career in 2005 playing for Iberoamericana before transferring to La Paz F.C. the following year. After three seasons in La Paz, he joined Wilstermann in early 2009. That year he played a significant role in helping the club avoid relegation. His good form rewarded him with a transfer to the country's most successful club, Bolívar in 2010.

He also has earned nine caps for the Bolivia national team since 2008, and scored his first international goal against Mexico on March 11, 2009.

International goals

References
 Base de Datos del Fútbol Argentino profile
 
 
 

1988 births
Living people
Sportspeople from Cochabamba
Bolivian footballers
Bolivia international footballers
C.D. Jorge Wilstermann players
Nacional Potosí players
Club Bolívar players
La Paz F.C. players
Guabirá players
Club Blooming players
Sport Boys Warnes players
Club San José players
Bolivian Primera División players
Association football midfielders
Bolivia under-20 international footballers